The Conrad Prebys Music Center (CPMC)  is located on the campus of the University of California San Diego in La Jolla, California. The Music Center houses the university's music department, and is anchored by the 400-seat Concert Hall, in addition to the 170-seat Recital Hall and an Experimental Theatre with variable digital acoustics system.

History 
From 1975 to 2009, the UC San Diego music department had been housed primarily in the Mandeville Center. But because the central Mandeville Auditorium had been designed as an all-purpose venue to accommodate a large variety of functions, the 800-seat hall was not ideally suited acoustically for music performance.

Financing for a new Music Center was approved by the UC System in late 2006, and construction began in 2007. The $53-million Music Center was completed in May 2009 after receiving two donations totaling $9 million from local philanthropist Conrad Prebys. The building was constructed from the inside out, designed by architects Mark Reddington and Wendy Pautz of LMN Architects in Seattle and renowned acoustician Cyril M. Harris, in consultation with then chair of the music department, Rand Steiger.

Conrad Prebys Concert Hall 
The centerpiece of the Music Center is the 400 seat Concert Hall. The hall's interior is an asymmetrical system of triangular wood and plaster surfaces that fold around the room in order to diffuse sound throughout the space. The acoustics of the Concert Hall was the final project of acoustician Cyril M. Harris' career, who retired following the completion of the hall.

The first event to take place at the CPMC Concert Hall occurred on May 8, 2009, with a gala concert featuring works by UC San Diego faculty composers Rand Steiger, Philippe Manoury, Pulitzer Prize winner Roger Reynolds and Guggenheim Fellowship recipients Anthony Davis and Lei Liang.

Awards 
The Music Center was awarded the 2009 American Institute of Architects Seattle Chapter Commendation Award, 2009 McGraw-Hill Construction Publishing's Best Higher Education/Research Facility in Southern California, and the 2010 San Diego Architecture Foundation Orchids & Onions' Grand Orchid designation.

See also 
Conrad Prebys Performing Arts Center

References

External links 

 Official website

University of California, San Diego
Performing arts centers in California
Culture of San Diego
Buildings and structures in San Diego